Mersin İdmanyurdu (also Mersin İdman Yurdu, Mersin İY, or MİY) Sports Club; located in Mersin, east Mediterranean coast of Turkey in 1980–81. The 1980–81 season was the 10th season of Mersin İdmanyurdu (MİY) football team in First League, the first level division in Turkey. They have relegated to second division at the end of the season. It was third time the team relegated. The club signed with coach İsmet Arıkan. Arıkan's assistant was conditioner Seyfi Alanya.

1980–81 First League participation
The 1980–81 season was the 23rd season of First League. The league was played with 16 teams and last three teams were relegated to Second League 1981–82. Mersin İdmanyurdu finished 15th First League 1980–81 season and relegated to second division.

Mersin İdmanyurdu has become the only team in the history of Turkish first level football league, whose points were deleted. In 1980–81 season the team has drawn away from the field in Beşiktaş game. For that reason TFF decided to award the match to Beşiktaş by 3-0 and delete two extra points of MİY. MİY finished season with 21 points at 15th place, 6 points back of 14th team.

At the end of first half MİY became the most violent team with 3 red cards, Tahir, Mücellip, Ali. Mehmet Şilan, Kazım and Osman were one match suspended players due to yellow card penalties.

Results summary
Mersin İdmanyurdu (MİY) 1980–81 First League summary:

Sources: 1980–81 Turkish First Football League pages.

League table
Mersin İY's league performance in Turkey First League in 1980–81 season is shown in the following table.

Results by round
Results of games MİY played in 1980–81 First League by rounds:

First half

Second half

1980–81 Turkish Cup participation
1980–81 Turkish Cup was played for the 19th season as Türkiye Kupası by 139 teams. First four elimination rounds were played in one-leg elimination system. Fifth and sixth elimination rounds and finals were played in two-legs elimination system. Mersin İdmanyurdu participated in 1980–81 Turkish Cup from round 5 and was eliminated at quarterfinals by Fenerbahçe. Fenerbahçe was eliminated at semifinals by Ankaragücü. Ankaragücü won the Cup for the 2nd time and became eligible for 1981–82 European Cup Winners' Cup. Ankaragücü who won the Cup as a second division team was also promoted to 1981-82 First League by means of a special decision which was applied only for them.

Cup track
The drawings and results Mersin İdmanyurdu (MİY) followed in 1980–81 Turkish Cup are shown in the following table.

Note: In the above table 'Score' shows For and Against goals whether the match played at home or not.

Game details
Mersin İdmanyurdu (MİY) 1980–81 Turkish Cup game reports is shown in the following table.
Kick off times are in EET and EEST.

Source: 1980–81 Turkish Cup pages.

Management

Club management
Aslan Çevirgen was club president.

Coaching team

1980–81 Mersin İdmanyurdu head coaches:

Note: Only official games were included.

1980–81 squad
Stats are counted for 1980–81 First League matches and 1980–81 Turkish Cup (Türkiye Kupası) matches. In the team rosters five substitutes were allowed to appear, two of whom were substitutable. Only the players who appeared in game rosters were included and listed in the order of appearance.

Sources: 1980–81 season squad data from maçkolik com, Milliyet, and Cem Pekin Archives.

News from Milliyet:
 Transfers in (Summer): İsmail (Trabzonspor); Right-back Mustafa Çimen (Beşiktaş); Harun, Levent (Gençlerbirliği); Yusuf (Sebat Gençlik), Eyüp (Adanaspor); Raşit (Tarsus İdmanyurdu).
 In the mid-season K.Metin was loaned from Galatasaray; and Vehbi was loaned from Diyarbakırspor. Nevruz loaned from Altay (21.12.1980).
 Özcan went to Fenerbahçe after the season (30.04.1981). In exchange Esat and İsmail came to MİY from Fenerbahçe.

See also
 Football in Turkey
 1980–81 Turkish First Football League
 1980–81 Turkish Cup

Notes and references

Mersin İdman Yurdu seasons
Turkish football clubs 1980–81 season